Manohar Nath Kaul (27 May 1923 – 19 December 2001) was a Kashmiri Pandit politician. He was born in 1922 in the Kashmiri Brahmin family of Sudershan Kaul in Nawakadal Srinagar. After finishing his M.A L.L.B from Aligarh Muslim University he joined active politics in 1947.

Political career
A three time MLA, Kaul was inducted as a revenue minister in Khwaja Shams-ud-Din's cabinet in 1963 for a short stint. He was again inducted into 
Ghulam Mohammed Sadiq's cabinet from 1969–72, and was given almost half a dozen portfolios mainly Revenue, excise, irrigation and flood control, food and supplies. He also remained vice president of the Jammu and Kashmir Pradesh Congress Committee (JKPCC) for more than a decade, apart from being the Hindu head of the congress in Pulwama and Anantag for more than 15 years. The former minister used to conduct conventions in valley to educate people about the ideology and agenda of the congress party along with Ghulam Mohammad Sadiq and Bakshi Ghulam Mohammad. Whenever a delegation used to come from Delhi, Kaul used to interact with the same as he had an excellent command of English. He also remained General Secretary of JKPCC from 73-77. He has also remained MLC from 1987–92, when militancy was at its peak in Jammu and Kashmir.

References

Members of the Jammu and Kashmir Legislative Council
1923 births
2009 deaths
Aligarh Muslim University alumni
Indian National Congress politicians
Jammu and Kashmir MLAs 1962–1967
Jammu and Kashmir MLAs 1967–1972